Chrysochares is a genus of leaf beetles in the subfamily Eumolpinae. It is found in Europe and Asia.

Species
 Chrysochares asiaticus (Pallas, 1771)
 Chrysochares punctatus (Gebler, 1845)
 Chrysochares punctatus constricticollis Lopatin, 1963
 Chrysochares punctatus punctatus (Gebler, 1845)

References

 Zipcodezoo Species Identifier
 Subfamily Eumolpinae (Chrysomelidae) - atlas of leaf beetles of Russia
 Biol.uni

Eumolpinae
Chrysomelidae genera
Beetles of Europe
Beetles of Asia